Bang Yi Khan station is an elevated railway station on MRT Blue Line. The station opened on 23 December 2019. The station is one of the nine stations of phase 3 of MRT Blue Line.

References

MRT (Bangkok) stations
Railway stations opened in 2019